The 2004 Coastal Carolina Chanticleers football team represented Coastal Carolina University in the 2004 NCAA Division I-AA football season. The Chanticleers were led by second-year head coach David Bennett and played their home games at Brooks Stadium. Coastal Carolina competed as a member of the Big South Conference. They finished the season 10–1 with a 4–0 record in conference play, winning their first Big South championship.

Schedule

References

Coastal Carolina
Coastal Carolina Chanticleers football seasons
Big South Conference football champion seasons
Coastal Carolina Chanticleers football